Sachin:A Hundred Hundreds is a book by V Krishnaswamy featuring the statistical peaks scaled by the cricketer Sachin Tendulkar during his international career. The book has a foreword by Rahul Dravid and Sachin's first coach Ramakant Achrekar.

References 

2012 non-fiction books
HarperCollins books
Cricket books